Eugenio Juan Zappietro, better known by his pseudonym Ray Collins (born February 29, 1936), is an Argentine retired comic book writer. Among his best-known works are Precinto 56 and Yor the Hunter.

Biography
Zappietro was born in Buenos Aires, Argentina on February 29, 1936. He began his writing career at the age of 23, encouraged by Julio Anibal Portas of Abril publishing, who suggested that he should use an American pseudonym.

Hugo Pratt commissioned him his first comic, Precinto 56, which had a police theme and was drawn by Jose Muñoz.

In 1967, he was a finalist in Spain's Planeta Award with his novel Time to Die.

In 1974, he created the comic Yor the Hunter along with the artist Juan Zanotto. The comic was also published in the Italian magazine Lanciostory beginning with its first issue (#0) in 1975. The 1983 Italian film Yor, the Hunter from the Future was based on the comic.

He also created the series The Vikings with Arturo del Castillo for the magazine "Tit-Bits" in 1975. Beginning in 1979, he continued the comic Dennis Martin, with drawings by Lito Fernandez.

Personal life
Besides been a comics writer, Zappiero also worked as a police officer and as the director of the police museum in his hometown San Martin.

References

External links
 "Ray Collins, biografía del hombre invisible" by Ivan de la Torre, Tebeosfera, 2003

1936 births
Living people
People from Buenos Aires
Argentine comics writers